"Take Your Shirt Off" is a song that is performed by American recording artist T-Pain. It originally served as the first promotional single off T-Pain's fourth studio album RevolveЯ, but never made it on the track list. It was released on iTunes for purchase on October 9, 2009.

Background
The song was originally inspired by Petey Pablo's hip-hop song "Raise Up", and the part of the song included Pablo telling his native peers "take your shirt off, twist it 'round yo' head, spin it like a helicopter," and the same words were used on T-Pain's version (with the addition of the word motherfucker, although it is slightly muted). The lyrics of the song are written by T-Pain, credited under his real name. Mannie Fresh & Qua z mo was the producers for the song. The music was featured in a trailer for Step Up 3-D. It was also used for the soundtrack of the film Lottery Ticket

Music video
The music video was released on December 2, 2009 on YouTube. Cameo appearances were made by George Clinton, Tay Dizm, Young Ca$h, Sophia Fresh, Rick Ross, Petey Pablo, Rebekah Leake and Brett Frantz. The video was directed by Gil Green and shot entirely in Tallahassee.

Chart performance
The song debuted at #80 on the Billboard Hot 100, and at #23 on the Australian ARIA Urban Charts.

Popular culture
The song is used on the official trailer for Step Up 3D. It was also used in the film Lottery Ticket starring T-Pain himself.

Charts

Year-end charts

References

2009 songs
T-Pain songs
Songs written by T-Pain
Song recordings produced by Mannie Fresh
Songs written by Mannie Fresh